Arbelodes franziskae is a moth in the family Cossidae. It is found in South Africa, where it has been recorded from the Cederberg. The habitat consists of submontane and montane woody riparian areas.

The length of the forewings is about 9 mm. The forewings are glossy smoke grey with a sepia streak.  The hindwings are glossy greyish olive.

Etymology
The species is named for Franziska Dorothea Sommerlatte.

References

Natural History Museum Lepidoptera generic names catalog

Endemic moths of South Africa
Moths described in 2010
Metarbelinae